Robert Paterson (c.1635–1717) was a Scottish academic who served as Principal of Marischal College from 1679 to 1717.

Life
Paterson was born in Foveran the son of John Paterson (later Bishop of Ross) and his wife Elizabeth Ramsay. His siblings included John Paterson later (Archbishop of Glasgow); George Paterson of Seafield (commissary); Sir William Paterson of Granton (barrister and clerk to the privy council); and a daughter, Isabella, who married Kenneth Mackenzie of Suddie.

He was educated at Marischal College becoming a "regent" in 1657. In 1671 he started teaching the "Bajan class" at the college and in 1673 was appointed college librarian. In November 1678 he replaced James Leslie as principal of Marischal College.

He was dismissed as principal due to his Jacobite sympathies in 1717 and died shortly thereafter.

Family
He married Agnes Carnegie daughter of David Carnegie of Craige, minister of Farnell. They had two sons and five daughters.

References
 

1717 deaths
Academics of the University of Aberdeen